Helios is a 2015 Hong Kong-Chinese crime thriller film directed by Longman Leung and Sunny Luk and starring an international ensemble cast from Hong Kong, China, Taiwan and South Korea. The film was released on 30 April 2015 in China and 1 May 2015 in Hong Kong.

Plot
South Korea's top most wanted criminal, nicknamed "Helios" (Chang Chen), and his assistant, nicknamed "Messenger" (Janice Man), have successfully stolen a weapon of mass destruction (WMD), secretly developed by the South Korean military, the portable nuclear explosive device DC8 along with sixteen raw material spheres. The police forces of Hong Kong, China, and South Korea were informed that "Helios" will hold an underground trading in Hong Kong.

An emergency response team was set up in Hong Kong. Its members, chief inspector Eric Lee Yan-ming (Nick Cheung) of the Counter-Terrorism Response Unit, senior Chinese official Song An (Wang Xueqi), and two South Korean weapon experts Choi Min-ho (Ji Jin-hee) and Park Woo-Cheol (Choi Siwon), work together to trace the whereabouts of the weapon. Lee also specially invites Physics professor Siu Chi-yan (Jacky Cheung) of the University of Hong Kong to serve as a special adviser for the operation.

Hong Kong, China and South Korea face the same objective, but with different purposes. Choi wants to hunt down "Helios" to take back the weapon to make sure not to divulge secrets of South Korea. In the position of the Chinese government, Song wants to resolve the current crisis in Hong Kong and halt any terrorism activities in Chinese territories. Lee and Siu face pressure from the two countries and have to deal with the greatest challenge since the establishment of the Counter-Terrorism Response Unit, with the situation getting tenser.

As time passes by each second, with "Messenger" arrested and DC8 falls into the hands of the Hong Kong Police Force, China and Korea fight for the right to possess the weapon. On the other hand, "Helios" appears in Macau, with plans to retaliate and repossess the weapon. During the last stand, conspiracies are gradually revealed, and Professor Siu is revealed as the real "Helios", with everyone caught off guard.

Cast
Jacky Cheung as Professor Siu Chi-yan (肇志仁), a Physics professor at the University of Hong Kong and a crisis expert who opposes DC8 to remain in Hong Kong, revealed as the real "Helios".
Nick Cheung as Eric Lee Yan-ming (李彦明), Chief Inspector of the Counter-Terrorism Response Unit and commander of the emergency response team.
Shawn Yue as Fan Ka-ming (范家明), Senior Inspector of the Counter-Terrorism Response Unit who formerly served in the Special Duties Unit and Criminal Intelligence Bureau. He is one of the deputy commanders of the emergency response team.
Wang Xueqi as Song Ahn (宋鞍), a senior official from China government who advocates the use of diplomatic means to deal with the crisis. He also advocates DC8 to remain in Hong Kong.
Janice Man as Zhang Yiyun (張怡君), nicknamed the "Messenger", Gam Dao-nin's assistant
Ji Jin-hee as Choi Min-ho (崔民浩), deputy director of officer of South Korea's National Intelligence Service and defense weapon expert. With a Ph.D. in mechanical engineering and physics, he came from a family of scientists. However, due to a research accident, he became the sole survivor of his family and was admitted lifelong immunization.
Choi Siwon as Park Woo-Cheol (朴宇哲), a South Korean special agent responsible for protecting Choi Min-ho's safety.
Yoon Jin-yi as Shin Mi-Kyung (申美京), a South Korean spy sent to Hong Kong to assist Choi Min-ho and Park Woo-cheul in their mission. She works in a magazine publishing company to cover up her identity.
Josephine Koo as Sophia, a former arms smuggler sixteen years ago and has since retired and relocated in Macau. She is also Gam Dao-nin's godmother and was later killed by her godson to cover up a secret.
Feng Wenjuan as Yuan Xiaowen (袁曉文), Chief Secretary of Mr. Song
Lee Tae-ran as Yoon Hee-seon, Choi Min-ho's wife
Kim Hae-sook as Park Young-sook, Director of NIS
Chang Chen as Gam Dao-nin (金燾年), a South Korean weapon smuggler who is rumored to be top wanted criminal "Helios", while in actuality, he was formulated by the real "Helios" to be responsible for executing his plot.
Tracy Chu as Tracy, an inspector of the Counter-Terrorism Response Unit and one of the deputy commanders of the emergency response team
Philip Keung as Wong Kin-Chung (王建中), a member of the emergency response team
Benny Lee as a member of the emergency response team representing the Immigration Department
Eric Chung as a member of the emergency response team representing the Leisure and Cultural Services Department
Ben Yuen as Representative of Transport Department
Timothy Cheng as a member of the emergency response team representing the Fire Services Department
Rachel Kan as a member of the emergency response team representing Hospital Authority
Chan Suk-yee as Director of Immigration
Paul Fonoroff as Martin Koo, a foreign journalist
Gill Mohindepaul Singh as Saad
Icy Wong as a reporter
Mike Leeder as Mr. Big, Middle Eastern buyer
Philippe Joly as one of Mr. Big's bodyguards
Kim Hye-yoon as Park Woo-cheol's sister

Release
The film held its first press conference on 10 December 2013 at the Sheraton Hotel in Macau where its first trailer was unveiled. The film was released in China on 30 April 2015.

Box office 
The film opened in China on 30 April 2015 and earned  in its four-day opening weekend, with 101,873 screenings and 3.24 million admissions, coming in fourth place at the Chinese box office behind Furious 7, You Are My Sunshine and The Left Ear. In Hong Kong, the film has grossed a total of HK$15.9 million (US$2.06 million).

References

External links
 
 

2015 action thriller films
2015 crime thriller films
2015 crime drama films
Hong Kong crime thriller films
Hong Kong action thriller films
Hong Kong detective films
2010s Cantonese-language films
Media Asia films
Police detective films
Films set in Hong Kong
Films shot in Hong Kong
Films about terrorism
Wanda Pictures films
Films directed by Longman Leung
Films directed by Sunny Luk
2010s Hong Kong films